The trefoil-toothed giant rat (Lenomys meyeri) is a species of rodent in the family Muridae.
It is found only in Sulawesi, Indonesia, where it is located throughout the island.

References

Rats of Asia
Old World rats and mice
Endemic fauna of Indonesia
Rodents of Sulawesi
Mammals described in 1879
Taxonomy articles created by Polbot
Taxa named by Fredericus Anna Jentink